also known as  was a Japanese Buddhist monk of the early Muromachi period of Japanese history, noted as the blind itinerant lute player (biwa hōshi) who gave the epic Heike Monogatari its present form.

Life
Little is known about his early life, but Kakuichi may have originally been a monk of Enkyō-ji near Himeji in Harima Province and may have been a nephew of Ashikaga Takauji. After losing his sight in his 30s, he is said to have come to Kyoto and joined the Tōdōza, a biwa hōshi guild, performing versions of the Heike Monogatari as entertainment for members of the aristocracy. Kakuichi was a student of Jōichi (城一), the most famous Heike reciter in Kyoto, but soon surpassed his master  and 1363 had the attained the highest rank (検校, Kengyō) within the guild. On his death, he was posthumous awarded the rank of Grand Master (総検校, Sōkengyō).

Work
Kakuichi's version of the Heike Monogatari, known as the Kakuichi-bon, was developed over several decades beginning in the 1330s or 1340s, and was written down only a few months before his death as he recited it to his pupil Teiichi. The Tōdōza split over whether or not to accept Kakuichi's new version, with the Yasaka-ryu rejecting it, and the Ichikata-ryu accepting it. The Yasaka-ryu declined after the Onin War, leaving the tradition in the hands of the Ichikata-ryu. The Kakuichi-bon is currently the most popular version, and is the version used for most scholarly studies.

References
 pp 500–543
 McCullough, Helen Craig. (1988). The Tale of the Heike. Stanford: Stanford University Press. 	;  OCLC 16472263

Notes

1299 births
1371 deaths
14th-century Japanese people
14th-century storytellers
Blind musicians
Japanese Buddhist clergy
Japanese lutenists
People of Muromachi-period Japan
Japanese blind people